Wick is a community in the Arun district of West Sussex, England. Originally a separate village, it now forms part of the built up area around Littlehampton. It lies on the A284 road 0.6 miles (1 km) north of the town centre.

There is an annual summer festival held in Wick. The Church Hall (Wick Hall) is one of the largest in the area, there are several flint Victorian buildings including All Saints Church, Lyminster School and one thatched cottage. Wick contains three separate parades of shops, including a Farm Foods, green grocer, florist, a laundrette, one pub and various other small specialist shops.

History
The village of Wick formed around Wick Manor, established after the Norman Conquest of 1066. It has an ancient Roman Brick/clay making site, (this now lies under a road called 'Potters Mead', off Courtwick Road). Wick had an Art Deco era Steam Laundry built in the 1920s, it has now been demolished.

An Alleyway or Twitten that passes by the site of the former True Blue public house, is known locally as 'Dark Alley' due to the black clinker surface laid down along its route.

During the early 1990s some areas of Wick had developed a reputation for drug and alcohol addiction, high teenage pregnancy, and low ‘community esteem’ this resulted in the establishment of a Christian charity called "The WIRE project" to address these issues. In recent years, efforts have been made to improve the quality of Wick's social housing, with many being refurbished.

In 2009 the True Blue pub was demolished to make way for new housing.

Sport and leisure
Wick has a Non-League football club Wick F.C. who play at Crabtree Park.

External links

The Wick Village Traders Association Facebook Page
The Wick Village Community website www.wickvillage.com
All Saints Church in Wick Village

Villages in West Sussex
Arun District
Littlehampton